Consensual non-monogamy (CNM), and its subset ethical non-monogamy (ENM), are the practice of non-monogamous intimate or sexual relations that are distinguished from infidelity by the knowledge and consent of those involved, and from polygamy by the various partners not being in a single marriage. Forms of consensual non-monogamy include swinging, polyamory, open relationships, cuckquean fetishism and cuckolding fetishism.

Consensual non-monogamy can take many different forms, depending on the needs and preferences of the individuals involved in specific relationships. In two surveys in 2013 and 2014, one fifth of surveyed single United States adults had, at some point in their lives, engaged in some sort of consensual non-monogamy.

It is common for swinging and open couples to maintain emotional monogamy while engaging in extra-dyadic sexual relations. Similarly, the friend/partner boundary in forms of consensual non-monogamy other than polyamory is typically fairly clear. Unlike other forms of non-monogamy, though, "polyamory is notable for privileging emotional intimacy with others." Polyamory is distinguished from some other forms of ethical non-monogamy in that the relationships involved are loving intimate relationships, as opposed to purely sexual relationships.

References

See also 

 Extramarital sex
 Mixed-orientation marriage
 The Ethical Slut

Sexual fidelity